Richard von Kienle (9 February 1908 – 18 May 1985) was a German linguist who specialized in Germanic and Indo-European linguistics.

Biography
Richard von Kienle was born in Freiburg, Germany on 9 February 1908. He gained his Ph.D. at the University of Heidelberg in 1931 under the supervision of Hermann Güntert. von Kienle subsequently served as an assistant at the Deutsches Rechtswörterbuch under . Since the summer of 1938 he was an acting professor at the University of Heidelberg, having stepped in for Güntert, who was in poor health at the time. He was later an acting professor at the University of Jena under . Since 1940 he was an associate professor at the University of Heidelberg.

In 1941, von Kienle was appointed a professor at the University of Hamburg. He served as a soldier in the Wehrmacht from 1942 to 1945 during World War II. He was recruited into the Ahnenerbe by Walter Wüst, and conducted research on Indo-European linguistics and Germanic studies. Along with Wüst, von Kienle was an editor of the journal Wörter und Sachen, which had been founded by Güntert. Due to his membership in the Nazi Party and the SS, von Kienle was fired from the University of Hamburg after World War II, and subsequently worked as a school teacher in Heidelberg. From 1953 to 1974, von Kienle was Professor of Indo-European Linguistics at the Free University of Berlin. He died in Berlin on 18 May 1985.

Selected works
Germanische Gemeinschaftsformen, Berlin: Das Ahnenerbe, Stuttgart: Kohlhammer, 1939
Gotische Texte, Heidelberg 1948
Fremdwörterlexikon, Heidelberg 1950, 10. Auflage 1965
mit Hans Haas: Lateinisch-deutsches Wörterbuch. Mit einer Einleitung über Sprachgeschichte, Lautgeschichte, Formenlehre und Wortbildungslehre von Richard v. Kienle, Heidelberg: F. H. Kerle 1952
Historische Laut- und Formenlehre des Deutschen, Tübingen 1960, 2. Auflage 1969

See also
 Franz Rolf Schröder
 Franz Altheim

Sources

Matthias Fritz: Indogermanistik an der Freien Universität Berlin, in: Karol Kubicki, Siegward Lönnendonker (Hrsg.), Die Altertums- und Kunstwissenschaften an der Freien Universität Berlin, V & R unipress, Göttingen 2015, S. 52ff

1908 births
1985 deaths
Academic staff of the Free University of Berlin
Germanic studies scholars
Linguists from Germany
Linguists of Germanic languages
Linguists of Indo-European languages
German military personnel of World War II
Indo-Europeanists
Writers from Freiburg im Breisgau
Academic staff of the University of Hamburg
Heidelberg University alumni
Academic staff of Heidelberg University
Academic staff of the University of Jena